Harlow Block may refer to:

Harlow Block (Marquette, Michigan)
Harlow Block (Portland, Oregon)